"Pushin P" (stylized as "pushin P") is a song by American rappers Gunna and Future, featuring fellow American rapper Young Thug. It was released on January 7, 2022, as the second track from Gunna's third studio album DS4Ever. The "hypnotic", alliterative track finds the trio rapping about "pushin p", which is a phrase popularized by Gunna that means to "keep it real". The track was regarded by some critics as a standout from DS4Ever, and became the album's highest-charting track, debuting at number seven on the Billboard Hot 100.

Background
With the song's release, the phrase "pushin P" became a trend online, with social media users posting blue emojis, and the context being that either something is "P", or it is not. This was developed through Gunna posting about "pushing P" online, prior to the song's release; "P" stands for "Pimp", but means to push positivity and "keep it real". Gunna detailed that when something is not "P", it has negative connotations, and vice versa. He also stated that for him it was initially a substitution for the word "pleas", however its definition is open to interpretation, as Gunna clarified: "P means paperwork, too. You can be pushing this P with paper". He further explained the slight difference between "kicking P" and "pushing P": "If you're in this [mansion] and it's rented, then you're kicking P. But if you buy this shit and you own it, then you're really pushing P". A week after DS4Evers release, Gunna kept the momentum of the trend going, changing the title of his Drake collaboration from "Pussy Power" to "P Power". According to Complexs Eric Skelton, although the phrase was popularized "in the mainstream" by Gunna, it had been used as a term in American regions like the Bay Area and Texas for years. After some Bay Area natives accused Gunna of "stealing" the term, he seemingly responded, claiming that his father introduced him to the saying.

Composition
"Pushin P" is a "hypnotic" track that sees the rappers delivering "intoxicating" flows, chanting "numb and muddy good-life fatalism over downtuned violin-hums and understated drum-spatters and eerie synth-tinkles". The song contains similar alliteration; lines about pushing things that start with the letter P. The Focuss Bruno Cooke noted how some words are deliberately misspelled, for instance the line "She not a lesbian, for P, she turn Pesbian". Cooke opined: "Overall, it's pretty clear that, at least in the context of the song, 'P' stands for a vulgar slang word for a woman's genitals". Furthermore, the song consists of various references to sexual acts and illegal drugs. Complexs Eric Skelton opined that the song is "basically just a chance for Gunna, Future, and Thug to pack a ludicrous amount of P-words into a single song", while Uproxx's Aaron Williams said the trio employs "a slurred, foggy take on the old-school in-and-out, pass-the-mic flow". Exclaim!s Michael Di Gennaro labeled the song "dark and brooding", calling it a display "of a master at work, someone who knows exactly the type of emotional reaction he wants to get from his audience and how to reach it".

Critical reception
Complexs Jessica McKinney praised Future for being "the glue that keeps the track together, delivering ad-libs and plenty of swagger on the chorus". Stereogums Tom Breihan called it a standout track on the album, stating that the song "sounds like blissfully plummeting down an abyss, secure in the feeling that you'll never hit the bottom". Tomás Mier of Rolling Stone also named it one of the standout tracks on DS4Ever. Jordan Darville of The Fader called it one of the best tracks on the album, while quipping: "There's still no explanation of Thug's 'I just fucked a cup of water' bar, but some things are too magical to be fully explained". Revolt's Jon Powell called it a "hard-hitting number". Consequences Eddie Fu named it the rap song of the week, highlighting Future and Thug's "toxic bars over icy production from Juke Wong and Wheezy". Fu also called Thug's "fucked a cup of water line" bizarre. In their album review, Pitchforks Alphonse Pierre wrote: "as forced as Gunnas new 'pushin' P' motto may be, the Wheezy instrumental it's laid over is so ominous it'll make the hairs stick up on the back of your neck. The middle section of the song, where Gunna raps gibberish for a moment, is the most fun he's having on the entire album". With the album's release, Billboards Jason Lipshutz said the song "arrives early in the track list as a de facto breakout single from the project".

Commercial performance
For the week of January 22, 2022, "Pushin P" debuted at number seven of the Billboard Hot 100, garnering 22.5 million streams and debuting at number two on the Streaming Songs chart. It marked Gunna's first top 10 debut, and his third top 10 entry, following "Drip Too Hard" and "Lemonade" with Internet Money. Future and Young Thug also earned their fifth and sixth Hot 100 top 10s, respectively, and their second shared top 10, after Drake's chart-topping "Way 2 Sexy".

Music video
The music video was released on January 12, 2022, directed by Caleb Jermale. It finds the rappers giving examples of what it means to "push p", as they are inside a club, luxury stores, a mansion, as they board private jets, and drop large amounts of cash at a strip club. HipHopDXs Michael Saponara called the visual "lavish", noting how it follows the trio "taking over a South Beach party, shopping at Miami's designer store district with eye candy on their hip, and pouring up some lean without a worry in the world". Actor Demetrius "Lil Meech" Flenory Jr. also makes a cameo appearance.

Charts

Weekly charts

Year-end charts

Certifications

References

External links
 Lyric video on YouTube

2022 songs
Songs written by Gunna (rapper)
Future (rapper) songs
Songs written by Future (rapper)
Young Thug songs
Songs written by Young Thug
Songs written by Wheezy (record producer)
Song recordings produced by Wheezy (record producer)